Qazi Wajid (26 May 1930– 11 February 2018) was a Pakistani actor. 

His works include Shama, Tanhaiyaan, Dhoop Kinare, Chand Grehan, Zair, Zabar, Pesh, Hawain, Mehndi, Afshan, Khuda Ki Basti and Ankahi. 

After 25 years on radio, he resigned and performed as an actor, joining television in 1966, and for his contributions in the field, he was eventually awarded the Pride of Performance Award in 1988 by the Government of Pakistan.

In a career spanning more than 50 years, he did "more than 1,200 dramas as a staff artist for Radio Pakistan since 1977, and more than 500 dramas for TV."

He died in Karachi on 11 February 2018.

Personal life
Born Qazi Abdul Wajid Ansari, his birthplace was the Gwalior state and the year is 1930, as he himself stated in one of his last interviews. 

His family, including five siblings (three brothers and two sisters), moved to Pakistan after the partition of 1947.

Career
He began his career by joining Radio Pakistan as a child artiste in 1956.

Selected filmography

Death
Qazi Wajid died of a heart attack on February 11, 2018, in Karachi. He was 87 years old.

See also:

 List of Lollywood actors

Awards 
 Pride of Performance Awards – (1988) from the Government of Pakistan.

References

1944 births
2018 deaths
Pakistani male television actors
Pakistani radio personalities
Muhajir people
People from Gwalior